Coal Ridge High School is a public secondary school in New Castle, Garfield County, Colorado, United States. It serves New Castle, Silt, and (occasionally) Rifle. It is within Garfield Re-2 School District.

The current address is 35947 US-6, New Castle, CO 81647.

The school was founded in 2005.
The Coal Ridge High School Cheer team has won five state championships (2016, 2018, 2019, 2020, 2021 coed) They have placed 2nd three times. (2015, 2017, 2018 all girl)

External links 
 

Public high schools in Colorado
Educational institutions established in 2005
Schools in Garfield County, Colorado
2005 establishments in Colorado